Lavoslav Horvat (Varaždinske Toplice, 27 September 1901 – Novi Marof, 4 October 1989) was a Croatian architect.

In 1926, Horvat enrolled as one of the first students of architecture at the Department of Architecture of the Academy of Fine Arts, University of Zagreb, under professor Drago Ibler.

He was the architect of the Hotel Jugoslavija in Belgrade, Serbia.

References

1901 births
1989 deaths
People from Varaždinske Toplice
20th-century Croatian architects
Vladimir Nazor Award winners
Academy of Fine Arts, University of Zagreb alumni
Burials at Miroševac Cemetery